Fan Ben (Chinese: 范賁; died 349), was a politician and emperor of the Cheng Han dynasty during the Sixteen Kingdoms. He was the son of Fan Changsheng, and after the fall Cheng Han to the Jin dynasty (266–420) in 347, he led a restoration of the state, briefly ruling over it before his defeat and death in 349. Despite proclaiming himself emperor, most, if not all, historians do not acknowledge his reign and consider Li Shi as the last true ruler of Cheng Han.

Life 
Fan Ben's family was from Danxing County (丹興縣; in present-day Qianjiang District, Chongqing) in Fuling Commandery (涪陵郡). His father, Fan Changsheng, was a famous Taoist leader who supported the Ba-Di rebel, Li Xiong, in forming the state of Cheng Han in 304. Li Xiong showed him great favour and appointed him Prime Minister. Fan Ben also served in Cheng Han's government as a Palace Attendant. After Changsheng's death in 318, his office was inherited by Fan Ben.

In 347, the Jin general, Huan Wen, conquered Cheng Han and received the emperor, Li Shi's surrender. However, some remnants of Cheng Han continued to resist Jin despite their takeover. In May 347, after Huan Wen left Yi province, the rebel generals, Deng Ding (鄧定) and Kui Wen (隗文), captured Chengdu. Due to Changsheng's immense reputation in the region, they proclaimed Fan Ben as their leader. According to historical records, he supposedly tricked many people of Shu into joining them through the use of the occult and mysticism.

Fan Ben's rule lasted until 349. In the summer of that year, Jin's Inspector of Yizhou, Zhou Fu and the general, Zhu Dao (朱燾) campaigned against him. They were able to kill him and restore order to the province.

References 

 Fang, Xuanling (ed.) (648). Book of Jin (Jin Shu).
 Sima, Guang (1084). Zizhi Tongjian
 Cui, Hong (501-522). Spring and Autumn Annals of the Sixteen Kingdoms (Shiliuguo Chunqiu)

Cheng Han emperors
Jin dynasty (266–420) rebels
349 deaths
Jin dynasty (266–420) people killed in action